The 1999–2000 NBA season was the 12th season for the Miami Heat in the National Basketball Association. During the off-season, the Heat signed free agents Otis Thorpe and undrafted rookie guard Anthony Carter. The Heat played the first two months of the season at the Miami Arena. They played their final home game at the Miami Arena on December 28, 1999 against the Minnesota Timberwolves, and then moved into the American Airlines Arena on January 2, 2000 against the Orlando Magic. The Heat got off to a 15–4 start, then later on holding a 30–17 record at the All-Star break. However, Tim Hardaway only played 52 games due to knee injuries, and Voshon Lenard was out for the remainder of the season with a lower abdominal strain after 53 games. At midseason, the team signed free agent Bruce Bowen. The Heat went on a 7-game winning streak between March and April, and finished first place in the Atlantic Division with a 52–30 record.

Alonzo Mourning averaged 21.7 points, 9.5 rebounds and 3.7 blocks per game, and was named Defensive Player of the Year for the second consecutive year. He was also named to the All-NBA Second Team, NBA All-Defensive First Team, was selected for the 2000 NBA All-Star Game, and finished in third place in Most Valuable Player voting behind Shaquille O'Neal and Kevin Garnett. In addition, Jamal Mashburn averaged 17.5 points and 5.0 rebounds per game, while Hardaway provided the team with 13.4 points and 7.4 assists per game, Lenard contributed 11.9 points per game off the bench as the team's sixth man, and P.J. Brown provided with 9.6 points and 7.5 rebounds per game. Three-point specialist Dan Majerle contributed 7.3 points and 1.3 steals per game, while Clarence Weatherspoon averaged 7.2 points and 5.8 rebounds per game off the bench, and Carter provided with 6.3 points, 4.8 assists and 1.2 steals per game.

In the Eastern Conference First Round of the playoffs, the Heat swept the Detroit Pistons in three straight games, en route to advancing to the second round for the first time since 1997. In the Eastern Conference Semi-finals, they faced the New York Knicks for the fourth consecutive year. After taking a 3–2 series lead, the Heat would lose the final two games to the 3rd-seeded Knicks, including an 83–82 loss in Game 7 in Miami. Following the season, Mashburn, Brown and Thrope were all traded to the Charlotte Hornets, while Voshon Lenard and Mark Strickland were both traded to the Denver Nuggets, and Weatherspoon was dealt to the Cleveland Cavaliers.

For the season, the Heat changed their primary logo adding a darker red color to the flaming basketball, and added new uniforms with side panels to their jerseys and shorts. The uniforms remained in use until 2009, where they switched the logo to the other leg of their shorts, while the primary logo is still present as of 2023.

Offseason

Draft picks

Roster

Regular season

Standings

z - clinched division title
y - clinched division title
x - clinched playoff spot

Record vs. opponents

Playoffs

|- align="center" bgcolor="#ccffcc"
| 1
| April 22
| Detroit
| W 95–85
| Jamal Mashburn (29)
| Dan Majerle (10)
| Anthony Carter (7)
| American Airlines Arena16,500
| 1–0
|- align="center" bgcolor="#ccffcc"
| 2
| April 25
| Detroit
| W 84–82
| Jamal Mashburn (24)
| Alonzo Mourning (8)
| Anthony Carter (13)
| American Airlines Arena16,500
| 2–0
|- align="center" bgcolor="#ccffcc"
| 3
| April 29
| @ Detroit
| W 91–72
| Clarence Weatherspoon (18)
| Thorpe, Weatherspoon (10)
| Anthony Carter (9)
| The Palace of Auburn Hills14,507
| 3–0
|-

|- align="center" bgcolor="#ccffcc"
| 1
| May 7
| New York
| W 87–83
| Alonzo Mourning (26)
| P. J. Brown (16)
| Tim Hardaway (7)
| American Airlines Arena20,053
| 1–0
|- align="center" bgcolor="#ffcccc"
| 2
| May 9
| New York
| L 76–82
| Jamal Mashburn (25)
| Alonzo Mourning (17)
| three players tied (3)
| American Airlines Arena20,078
| 1–1
|- align="center" bgcolor="#ccffcc"
| 3
| May 12
| @ New York
| W 77–76 (OT)
| Alonzo Mourning (23)
| P. J. Brown (12)
| Anthony Carter (8)
| Madison Square Garden19,763
| 2–1
|- align="center" bgcolor="#ffcccc"
| 4
| May 14
| @ New York
| L 83–91
| Alonzo Mourning (27)
| Alonzo Mourning (14)
| Anthony Carter (7)
| Madison Square Garden19,763
| 2–2
|- align="center" bgcolor="#ccffcc"
| 5
| May 17
| New York
| W 87–81
| Jamal Mashburn (21)
| P. J. Brown (12)
| Anthony Carter (5)
| American Airlines Arena20,021
| 3–2
|- align="center" bgcolor="#ffcccc"
| 6
| May 19
| @ New York
| L 70–72
| Alonzo Mourning (22)
| Majerle, Mourning (10)
| Dan Majerle (7)
| Madison Square Garden19,763
| 3–3
|- align="center" bgcolor="#ffcccc"
| 7
| May 21
| New York
| L 82–83
| Alonzo Mourning (29)
| Alonzo Mourning (13)
| Tim Hardaway (7)
| American Airlines Arena20,063
| 3–4
|-

Player statistics

NOTE: Please write the players statistics in alphabetical order by last name.

Season

Playoffs

Awards and honors
 Alonzo Mourning, NBA Defensive Player of the Year Award
 Alonzo Mourning, All-NBA Second Team
 Alonzo Mourning, NBA All-Defensive First Team

Transactions

References

Miami Heat seasons
Miami
Miami Heat
Miami Heat